Lieutenant General Carl-Johan Edström (born 21 May 1967) is a Swedish Air Force officer. He currently serves as Chief of Joint Operations since 1 January 2023. Prior to that Edström served as Chief of Air Force from 2019 to 2022.

Early life
Edström was born on 21 May 1967 in Nora, Sweden, and was raised in Klutmark, a village 10 kilometers west of Skellefteå. Carl-Johan Edström is twin brother of Swedish Air Force colonel Carl-Fredrik Edström. Carl-Johan Edström started his military career as platoon leader in the Norrland Brigade in Västerbotten Regiment (I 20) in Umeå in 1988.

Career
Edström trained as a pilot at the Swedish Air Force Flying School in Ljungbyhed and was commissioned as an officer in 1989 with the rank of second lieutenant in Norrbotten Wing. There he was promoted to lieutenant in 1995 and to captain in 1998. In 1996, Edström served as squad leader in the 212th Fighter Squadron (212. stridsflygdivisionen). During the Swedish flight operation over Libya in 2011, he was operations commander for the Swedish flight contingent FL02, part of the Operation Unified Protector. In Afghanistan, he served as senior adviser and planning manager for Train Advise Assist Command – Air (TAAC – Air). Edström served as a staff officer in the Policy and Plans Department in the Defence Staff (Ledningsstabens inriktningsavdelning, LEDS INRI) until he on 16 January 2015 took command as wing commander of Norrbotten Wing and commander of Luleå Garrison.

In addition to Swedish officer training, in 2014 he received a master's degree in strategy from the Air War College in the USA. He attended a Higher Management Course at the Swedish Defence University in 2015 and at Solbacka in 2016 as well the Common Security and Defence Policy High Level Course at the European Security and Defence College in Brussels from 2016 to 2017. From the re-establishment of the Air Staff on 1 January 2019, Edström served as Deputy Chief of Air Force until 4 September 2019 when he was appointed Chief of Air Force, taking office on 1 October 2019. He was promoted to major general at the same date.

On 30 June 2022, the Swedish government appointed Edström lieutenant general and chief of the new Joint Operations Unit from 1 January 2023, succeeding Lieutenant General Michael Claesson as Chief of Joint Operations. From 15 December 2022 to 31 December 2022, Edström was placed at the disposal of the Chief of Joint Operations.

Personal life
Edström is married to Ulrika and they have two sons, Gustav and Oscar.

Dates of rank
1989 – Second lieutenant
1995 – Lieutenant
1998 – Captain
19?? – Major
20?? – Lieutenant colonel
16 January 2015 – Colonel
1 October 2018 – Brigadier general
1 October 2019 – Major general
1 January 2023 – Lieutenant general

Awards and decorations

Swedish
   For Zealous and Devoted Service of the Realm
   Swedish Armed Forces Conscript Medal
   Swedish Armed Forces International Service Medal
   Norrbotten Wing Medal of Merit (Norrbottens flygflottiljs (F 21) förtjänstmedalj, NorrbffljGM)
   Home Guard Silver Medal (5 September 2022)

Foreign
   Bronze Star Medal (24 October 2019)
   Grand Officer of the Order of Aeronautical Merit (22 October 2020)
   NATO Non-Article 5 medal for Operation Unified Protector (2011)
   NATO Non-Article 5 medal for Operation Resolute Support (2018)

References

1967 births
Living people
Swedish Air Force lieutenant generals
People from Heby Municipality
Air War College alumni
Swedish twins